Jagun is a small market  in Margherita Tehsil in Tinsukia District of north-eastern state Assam, India. Jagun is connected by National Highway 315 (NH 315) to Ledo. National Highway 315 (NH 315) which connects Ledo to Indo-Myanmar border (Stillwell Road) across Pangsau Pass through Jagun. There are 2 government high school 12 middle school and more than 20 primary schools.

Nearest town and villages 
 Tipong
 Lekhapani
 Tirap Gaon
 Ledo, Assam

References

External links
 2 soldiers die as militants hit Army vehicle in near Jagun, Assam

Cities and towns in Tinsukia district
Tinsukia